Dimerocostus is a group of plants in the  Costaceae described as a genus in 1891. It is native to Central and South America.

 Species
 Dimerocostus argenteus (Ruiz & Pav.) Maas - Peru, Bolivia
 Dimerocostus cryptocalyx N.R.Salinas & Betancur - Colombia
 Dimerocostus strobilaceus Kuntze - Honduras, Nicaragua, Costa Rica, Panama, Colombia, Venezuela (including Venezuelan Antilles), Guyana, Suriname, Ecuador, Peru, Bolivia

References

Costaceae
Zingiberales genera